Ba Dexin (born 14 June 1990 in Harbin) is a Chinese curler. He competed at the 2010, 2011, 2012 and 2013, 2014, 2015 and 2017 World Curling Championships, and at the 2014 Winter Olympics in Sochi, where the Chinese team placed fourth. He also competed in the mixed doubles tournament of the 2018 Winter Olympics with partner Wang Rui, placing fourth.

Personal life
Ba was educated at Harbin Sport University.

References

External links

1990 births
Living people
Curlers at the 2014 Winter Olympics
Curlers at the 2018 Winter Olympics
Chinese male curlers
Olympic curlers of China
Sportspeople from Harbin
Asian Games medalists in curling
Curlers at the 2017 Asian Winter Games
Medalists at the 2017 Asian Winter Games
Asian Games gold medalists for China
Pacific-Asian curling champions